Ulyana Vyacheslavovna Lopatkina (born 23 October 1973) is a Russian prima ballerina who performed with the Mariinsky Theatre from 1991–2017. She studied at the Vaganova Academy with  Natalia Dudinskaya. Upon graduation Lopatkina joined the Kirov/Mariinsky Theatre Ballet in 1991, and was promoted to principal dancer in 1995. Lopatkina did not dance during the 2016–2017 season due to injury, and her retirement from the Mariinsky was announced on the company's website on 16 June 2017.

Performances and repertoire
Lopatkina excels in classic and dramatic roles. She is a perfect example of the Russian (Kirov) school with long limbs, great strength and a classical purity of line, as well as noted musicality.

Her repertoire includes: Giselle (Giselle, Myrtha),
Le Corsaire (Medora)
La Bayadère (Nikia)
Grand pas from Paquita
The Sleeping Beauty (Lilac Fairy)
Swan Lake (Odette-Odile)
Raymonda (Raymonda, Clemans)
The Swan
Scheherazade (Zobeide)
The Fountain of Bakhchisarai (Zarema)
The Legend of Love (Mekhmeneh Bahnu)
Leningrad Symphony (The Girl)
Pas de Quatre (Маria Taglioni)
Serenade
Tchaikovsky's Piano Concerto No. 2 (Ballet Imperial)
Symphony in C (2nd Movement)
La Valse
Jewels (Diamonds)
In the Night
The Nutcracker (highlights: Teacher and Pupil)
Le jeune homme et la mort
Goya-Divertissement
Le baiser de la fée (Fairy), Le Poeme de l´Extase
In the Middle

Personal life
Lopatkina was married to architect and writer Vladimir Kornev until their divorce in 2010. They have a daughter, Masha, born 2002.

Lopatkina revealed details about her daily life in an interview to The Sunday Times in 2005. She wakes up between 9am to 10am. At the Kirov, she first attends a class with other dancers and followed this with a personal rehearsal with Ninel Kurgapkina, until the latter's death. After a break, Lopatkina has more rehearsals or helps teaching younger dancers.

Lopatkina uses two pairs of shoes in each performance which are specially made for her.

Awards
International Vaganova-prix Competition (St. Petersburg, 1991).
Golden Sofit (1995)
The Golden Mask (1997)
Prix Benois de la Danse (1997)
The Baltika Prize (1997)
The Evening Standard (1998)
State Prize of Russia (1999)
Honoured Artist of Russia (2000)
The Baltika Prize (2001)
People's Artist of Russia (2006).

Filmography and photo gallery
 Lopatkina's Filmography. MSN Movies (retrieved 30 December 2007)
Lopatkina – Photo Gallery at www.ballerinagallery.com (retrieved 30 December 2007)

See also
List of Russian ballet dancers

References

External links
Dyukova, L. and Hageman, M. Ulyana Lopatkina at www.ballet.classical.ru (retrieved 30 December 2007, in Russian)
Delaney, Jennifer.  Uliana Lopatkina. Ballet Magazine, Nov 1997 (retrieved 30 December 2007)
Ng, Kevin.  Interview with Uliana Lopatkina. Ballet Magazine, Oct 1999 (retrieved 30 December 2007)

1973 births
Living people
Prima ballerinas
Russian ballerinas
People's Artists of Russia
Prix Benois de la Danse winners
Mariinsky Ballet principal dancers
Vaganova graduates
20th-century Russian ballet dancers
21st-century Russian ballet dancers